Renaissance FC or RFC is a football (soccer) club from Chad based in N'Djamena. The club won Chad Premier League 7 times, last time in 2007. Recently, it produced few Chad national football team players, such as Mondésir Alladjim, Yaya Kerim, Esaie Djikoloum and Hassan Diallo.

The club's colours are traditionally green and red.

History

RFC was created in 1954, a period still under colonial domination. Constituted on the basis of the French law of 1901, RFC is a purely associative club, falling under no corporation. The club was national champion 6 times, first time in 1989. In 2011, the club won national cup and supercup, after beating national champions Foullah Edifice in both finals.

Stadium
Stade Omnisports Idriss Mahamat Ouya, also named Stade National, is a multi-purpose stadium located in N'Djamena, Chad. It is currently used mostly for football matches.  The stadium holds 20,000 people. It is currently the home ground of the Chad national football team. It is named after former Chadian highjumper Mahamat Idriss (1942—1987).

Rivalries

RFC's arch-rivals are Elect-Sport FC.

Sponsors

The club was sponsored by CGCOC, a Chinese construction company.

Achievements
Chad Premier League: 7
 1989, 2002, 2003, 2004, 2005, 2006, 2007.

Chad Cup: 2
 1990, 1996.

Coupe de Ligue de N'Djaména: 2
 2011, 2013.

Chad Super Cup: 1
 2011.

Performance in CAF competitions
CAF Champions League: 3 appearances
2005 – Preliminary Round
2006 – Preliminary Round
2007 – Preliminary Round

African Cup of Champions Clubs: 1 appearance
1990 – Preliminary Round

CAF Confederation Cup: 1 appearance
2012 – First Round

CAF Cup Winners' Cup: 4 appearances
 1991 – First Round
 1994 – withdrew in First Round
 1997 – First Round
 1999 – First Round

Current staff
.

List of coaches

Idriss Mahamat Ouya
Mahamat Tounia
Fromageon
Djimassal Kemobe
Ousmane Tigabe
Mahamat N’Galbogui
1997 – Mahamat Oumar Yaya (alias Modou Kouta)
1998 – Douba Djorio & Moussa Alhadj 
1999 – Kaguer Beakono
2002 – Djibrine Démbélé
2003 – Kaguer Beakono
2004 Moukhtar Njoya & Modou Kouta
2005 – Modou Kouta
2006–2007 – Emmanuel Boukar
2007 – Modou Kouta
 Modou Kouta
2010 – Denis Tokene
2011 – Djimiang Mbailemdana
2012 – Yean Claude Yerima
2012 – Modou Kouta
2015 Francis Oumar Belonga
2016 Ngartessen Ngarhokarial

Presidents

 El Hadj Youssouf
 Abderamane Bechir (2010–)
 Moctar Mahamoud Hamid

References

Football clubs in Chad
N'Djamena